Bappaditya Bandopadhyay or Bappaditya Banerjee (28 August 1970 – 7 November 2015) was an Indian film director and poet.

Career 
Bandopadhyay was the recipient of the Most Promising Director award for the year 2003, by the BFJA (Bengal Film Journalists' Association). His second feature film Silpantar (Colours of Hunger) was premiered at the Sofia International Film Festival, Bulgaria. The film was selected in the competitive section of the International Film Festival Bratislava in 2003. It was the only Indian film other than Devdas selected at the 2003 Helsinki International Film Festival. Debashree Roy won the Kalakar Award for Best Actress for her performance in the film.

Bappaditya Bandopadhyay’s first feature film Sampradan (The Offering of the Daughter) was selected in the competitive section of the 6th Dhaka International Film Festival, 2000. The film won three major awards in the categories of Best Supporting Actress, Best Supporting Actor and Best Female Playback Singer in the BFJA Awards that year. It also won the Dishari Award in the category of Best Music Director.

His third feature film Devaki, starring Perizaad Zorabian and Suman Ranganathan, two Bollywood actresses, in English and Hindi was released in 2006. The film was selected and screened at the Indian Osean section of the 7th Osian’s Cinefan Film Festival. The film was in the competition section in the Temecula Valley International Film Festival and the Idaho International Film Festival. It also won the Best Feature Film Award at the Asheville Film Festival.

Kantatar, the fourth feature film directed by Bandopadhyay was selected in the Asian competition of the 7th Osian’s Cinefan Film Festival. The film was also screened at the Raindance Film Festival in London.

Bandopadhyay also directed a television serial, Anandanagarir kathakata, on the architectural history of Kolkata for the Bengali television channel Alpha Bangla. His documentary on the tribal masks was broadcast by Doordarshan.

His film, Kagojer Bou, based on the novel of the same name by Shirshendu Mukhopadhyay, released in 2010.

He was a long time associate of the editor Dipak Mandal with whom he worked 2009 to 2015.

Bandopadhyay was also a poet. His published works include Pokader Atmiyasajan (Friends and Relatives of the Insects). He wrote regularly on the various aspects of modern cinema.

Death 
Bappaditya died of multiple organ failure on 7 November 2015 in Kolkata, aged 45.

Filmography
The following is the list of films directed by Bappaditya Bandopadhyay. For many of these movies, Bappaditya Bandopadhyay is also credited for the story and screenplay:

Director

References

External links

 

2015 deaths
21st-century Indian film directors
Film directors from Kolkata
Bengali film directors
1970 births
Ramakrishna Mission schools alumni
Asutosh College alumni
University of Calcutta alumni
Hindi-language film directors
20th-century Indian film directors